Dayin (Mandarin: 大两镇) is a town in Pingwu County, Mianyang, Sichuan, China.

See also 
 List of township-level divisions of Sichuan

References 

Towns in Sichuan
Pingwu County